Bothwell is an unincorporated community in the Bear River Valley in eastern Box Elder County, Utah, United States.

Description

Bothwell was founded as a farming community in 1894. It was originally named Rowville, after Mormon pioneer William H. Rowe. It was renamed Bothwell in 1918, to honor the builders of the Bothwell Canal, a project that aided farming in the area by bringing irrigation water from the Bear River. John R. Bothwell was president of the waterworks at that time.

Bothwell voted to incorporate as a town in 1937, in order to issue municipal bonds to develop the culinary water system. It was disincorporated sometime in the 1960s.

See also

References

External links

Unincorporated communities in Box Elder County, Utah
Unincorporated communities in Utah
Populated places established in 1894
Former towns in Utah